Jean Bertolino (born 31 March 1936 in Marseille) is a French journalist and writer.

Biography 
A former student at the École supérieure de journalisme de Paris (class 1959–1961), a senior reporter and war correspondent, Bertolino worked for La Croix, Le Monde, Le Figaro and several provincial dailies. He was awarded the Albert Londres Prize in 1967 for his coverage of Vietnam and Cambodia at war and the revolt of the Kurds in Iraq, published in the newspaper La Croix and reprinted by numerous foreign newspapers.

In 1987, he became responsible for the reporting department at TF1, a public channel with which he had been collaborating since 1983. From 1988 he was the producer of 52 sur la Une, a magazine whose last issue was presented in June 2001.

He is also the author of novels.

Works 
1968: Vietnam sanglant, Stock
1969: Les Trublions, Stock
1974: Les Orangers de Jaffa, Éditions France-Empire
1979: Albanie, la sentinelle de Staline, Éditions du Seuil
1993: Histoires vécues, L'Archipel
1997: Madame l'Etoile, Flammarion
1998: La Frontière des fous, Flammarion
2000: Le Chant du Farou, Alzieu
2002: Chaman, Presses de la Cité
2004: Fura-Tena, Presses de la Cité
2010: Pour qu'il ne meure jamais, Calmann-Lévy
2014: Et je te donnerai les trésors des ténèbres, Calmann-Lévy

Prizes 
 Prix Albert Londres 1967.

References

External links 
 Jean Bertolino on Babelio
 Jean Bertolino on Persses de la Cité
 Islam : superbe coup de gueule de Jean Bertolino, grand reporter on Riposte laïque
 Jena Bertolino on YouTube
 Jean Bertolino sur le site de l'ESJ

20th-century French writers
20th-century French male writers
21st-century French writers
20th-century French journalists
21st-century French journalists
French war correspondents
Albert Londres Prize recipients
1936 births
Writers from Marseille
Living people
French male non-fiction writers